Nepal competed in the Summer Olympic Games for the first time at the 1964 Summer Olympics in Tokyo, Japan.

Results by event

Athletics 
Marathon
 Bahadur Bhupendra - did not finish
 Bahadur Thapa Ganga - did not finish

Boxing 
Flyweight
 Thapa Namsing - eliminated in the round of 16
Featherweight
 Thapa Bhim Bahadur - eliminated in the round of 32
Lightweight
 Gurung Ram Prasad - eliminated in the round of 32
Light welterweight
 Pun Om Prasad - eliminated in the round of 16

References
Official Olympic Reports

Nations at the 1964 Summer Olympics
1964
1964 in Nepal